Wolf is a Swedish heavy metal band from Örebro. Formed in 1995, the band has since released eight studio albums and toured with Saxon, Evile, Tankard and more recently, Trivium.

History 
Formed in 1995, the band has since released eight studio albums and have toured with renowned heavy metal bands Saxon, Evile and more recently, Trivium.  In support of their seventh studio album Devil Seed, released in August 2014, they toured the UK with Primitai in early February 2015.  Wolf once again teamed up with Primitai in 2019 to tour the UK before the release of their eighth studio album Feeding The Machine (2020).

On 22 December 2021 the band revealed the title and artwork for their ninth studio album, Shadowland, which was subsequently released on 1 April 2022.

Members

Current members 
 Niklas Stålvind – vocals, guitar, bagpipes (1995–present)
 Simon Johansson – guitar (2011–present)
 Pontus Egberg – bass (2019–present)
 Johan Koleberg – drums (2019–present)

Former members 
 Henrik Y Johansson – guitar (1999–2000; died 2006)
 Johan Bülow – guitar (2000–2002)
 Daniel Bergkvist – drums (1995–2005)
 Mikael Goding – bass (1995–2007)
 Tobias Kellgren – drums (2005–2008)
 Johannes Losbäck – guitar, backing vocals (2002–2011)
 Anders G Modd – bass (2007–2019)
 Richard A Holmgren – drums (2008–2019)

Discography

Studio albums 
Wolf (2000)
Black Wings (2002)
Evil Star (2004)
The Black Flame (2006)
Ravenous (2009)
Legions of Bastards (2011)
Devil Seed (2014)
Feeding the Machine (2020)
Shadowland (2022)

Other releases 

Demo I [Demo] (1995)
Demo II [Demo] (1996)
Demo 98 [Demo] (1998)
In The Shadow of Steel [Single] (1999)
The Howling Scares Me to Death [Single] (1999)
Moonlight [CD, EP] (2001)
A World Bewitched [CD, Single, Promo] (2002)
Nightstalker [7", Single] (2002)
Wolf's Blood [CD, Single] (2004)

References

External links 

Wolf at Century Media
Wolf at Rockdetector

Swedish heavy metal musical groups
Musical groups established in 1995